Darboe is a Gambian surname. Notable people with the surname include:

Abdou Darboe (born 1990), Gambian footballer
Dembo Darboe (born 1998), Gambian footballer
Ebrima Darboe (born 2001), Gambian footballer
Ousainou Darboe (born 1948), Gambian human rights lawyer and politician

Mandinka surnames